The Mirisch Company was an American film production company owned by Walter Mirisch and his brothers, Marvin and Harold Mirisch. The company also had sister firms known at various times as Mirisch Production Company, Mirisch Pictures Inc., Mirisch Films, and The Mirisch Corporation.

History 
Walter Mirisch began to work as a producer at Monogram Pictures beginning with Fall Guy (1947), the profitable Bomba the Jungle Boy series, Wichita (1955), and The First Texan (1956), by which time the company was known as Allied Artists. Walter Mirisch was in charge of production at the studio when it made Invasion of the Body Snatchers (1956) and Love in the Afternoon (1957).

The Mirisch Company was founded in 1957 at which time it signed a 12-picture deal with United Artists (UA) that was extended to 20 films two years later. UA acquired the company on March 1, 1963, but the Mirisch brothers continued to produce for their distribution, under other corporate names, in rented space at the Samuel Goldwyn Studio.

It produced many successful motion pictures for United Artists, beginning with Fort Massacre (1958) but later including Some Like It Hot (1959), The Horse Soldiers (1959), The Apartment (1960), The Magnificent Seven (1960), West Side Story (1961), Follow That Dream (1962 with Elvis Presley), The Great Escape (1963), The Pink Panther (1963), Hawaii (1966), In the Heat of the Night (1967), The Thomas Crown Affair (1968), Fiddler on the Roof (1971), and many others.

In 1964 Mirisch Films Ltd, or Mirisch Films GB was formed in the United Kingdom for the production of 633 Squadron, A Shot in the Dark and several other films. The Pink Panther featured an animated Pink Panther that soon became a star of a series of cinema cartoons made by DePatie–Freleng Enterprises that were released by Mirisch/UA.

Mirisch first entered television in 1959 with the series, Wichita Town for NBC. It also co-produced live-action television shows such as The Rat Patrol, Hey Landlord and The Magnificent Seven television series, as well as a number of television movies and cartoon shows of The Super 6 and The Pink Panther Show.

The company forged long-term associations with directors such as Billy Wilder, Blake Edwards, Robert Wise, George Roy Hill, William Wyler, J. Lee Thompson, John Sturges, and Norman Jewison, who directed three consecutive successes for it: The Russians Are Coming, the Russians Are Coming (1966), In the Heat of the Night (1967), and The Thomas Crown Affair (1968).

Films and series 
The following were from Mirisch Films:
 The Apartment (1960)
 The Party (1968)
 The Pink Panther (1963)
 633 Squadron (1964)
 A Shot in the Dark (1964)
 Submarine X-1 (1968)
 Inspector Clouseau (1968)
 Attack on the Iron Coast (1968)
 Hell Boats (1970)
 Various DePatie–Freleng and United Artists animated cartoons
 The Pink Panther
 The Inspector
 Roland and Rattfink
 The Ant and the Aardvark
 Tijuana Toads/Texas Toads
 The Blue Racer
 Hoot Kloot
 The Dogfather
 Misterjaw
 Crazylegs Crane
Same Time, Next Year (1978)
 Dennis the Menace in Mayday for Mother (1981)

References 

Mass media companies established in 1957
Film production companies of the United States
Former Metro-Goldwyn-Mayer subsidiaries
Mirisch family
1957 establishments in California